Sauro Gelichi (born Piombino (LI), 15 April 1954) is a Medieval archaeologist and a professor at Ca' Foscari University of Venice. He has published widely on his subject and supervised various excavations. In 2004 he was appointed Honorary Inspector Archaeologist with expertise on the Middle Ages for the Emilia-Romagna region.

References

External links
University staff page.

1954 births
People from Piombino
Italian archaeologists
Living people